Santa Cilia (in Aragonese: Santa Zilia) is a municipality located in Jacetania, province of Huesca, Aragon, Spain. It is 14 km from the town of Jaca between the River Aragon and the national highway N-240.

History
Santa Cilia's history is linked to the Royal Monastery de San Juan de la Peña as far back as the 10th century. In 1336 "the town was deserted and destroyed by the instability, death and heavy burdens on its neighbours." At about the same time the present layout of the old town was created, consisting of a nearly six blocks, though its straight streets are reminiscent of a Roman camp.

The church was rebuilt, replacing a medieval church with the addition of a bell-tower in 1646. Walls to protect the church from flooding were added in the 18th century.

The old medieval bridge is now broken, but once stretched 160m with eight spans and was an important toll bridge over the River Aragon.

Santa Cilia became a municipality in 1834 and attained its greatest population in 1920 with 520 inhabitants and about 90 houses. However emigration, mainly to Argentina, France and Barcelona reduced its size to the present day level.

Mayors

Demographic data
Population data for Santa Cilia between 1842 and 2007:

Modern times

Its airfield is a popular with glider pilots who wish to explore the nearby Pyrenees.

Villages
Santa Cilia
Somanés is a hamlet with 14 inhabitants that has been part of the municipality since 1969. It has a baroque 18th-century parish church dedicated to San Ramon.

Festivals
30 April (Romería a la Virgen de la Peña)
15 May (San Isidro)
8 September (La Natividad de la Virgen)

External links
 Official website 
 Tourist attractions

References

Municipalities in the Province of Huesca